A perfect attendance award is traditionally given at the end of the school year in U.S. schools as a way to honor students who were present for every day of school during that year, or in some cases across multiple years. Supporters believe that the award promotes education by encouraging students to attend class.

Offering a perfect attendance award may promote presenteeism and hurt public health by encouraging students to attend class when sick with a potentially contagious illness, while punishing those who make the decision to stay home to recover.  The US Centers for Disease Control and Prevention discourages schools from offering awards or other incentives to promote school attendance by students who are sick or potentially contagious.

References

Education awards